Weightlifting at the 2013 Asian Youth Games was held in Nanjing International Expo Centre, Nanjing, China between 17 and 21 August 2013.

Medalists

Boys

Girls

Medal table

Results

Boys

56 kg
17 August

62 kg
17 August

69 kg
19 August

77 kg
21 August

85 kg
21 August

Girls

48 kg
17 August

53 kg
19 August

58 kg
19 August

63 kg
21 August

References
Boys 56kg Results
Boys 62kg Results
Boys 69kg Results
Boys 77kg Results
Boys 85kg Results
Girls 48kg Results
Girls 53kg Results
Girls 58kg Results
Girls 63kg Results

External links
Official Website

2013 Asian Youth Games events
Asian Youth Games
2013 Asian Youth Olympics